Mglin is a town and the administrative center of Mglinsky District in Bryansk Oblast, Russia, located on the Sudynka River  west of Bryansk, the administrative center of the oblast. Population:

History

Mglin was first mentioned in 1389, though the settlement it was built on had existed since the 12th century.

During World War II, Mglin was occupied by the German Army from 16 August 1941 to 22 September 1943.
Prior to the war, 726 Jews lived in the town. The majority of Jews were merchants and artisans. There was also a Jewish kolkhoz. There was a synagogue in the town, but it was closed before the war. Some of the Jews managed to evacuate before the Germans arrived. Shortly after the occupation, all of the Jews were registered and marked. In January 1942, they were confined to a prison, where they stayed till the execution on March 2, 1942. While in prison, the Jews were used for forced labor. Before being executed, the Jews had to undress to underwear in the little house, which used to be a morgue, situated about 500m from the mass grave. The shooting was carried out by a special German punitive unit in black uniforms and around 500 people were killed.

Administrative and municipal status
Within the framework of administrative divisions, Mglin serves as the administrative center of Mglinsky District. As an administrative division, it is incorporated within Mglinsky District as Mglinsky Urban Administrative Okrug. As a municipal division, Mglinsky Urban Administrative Okrug is incorporated within Mglinsky Municipal District as Mglinskoye Urban Settlement.

Religion

The Dormition Cathedral, built in 1815–1830 in the Neoclassical style, functions in the town.

References

Notes

Sources

External links
 The murder of the Jews of Mglin during World War II, at Yad Vashem website.

Cities and towns in Bryansk Oblast
Mglinsky Uyezd
Holocaust locations in Russia